Suresh Fernando (born Wannakuwatta Waduge Suresh Tharaka Fernando on 7 June 1986) is a Sri Lankan cricketer. He is a right-handed batsman and right-arm off-break bowler who plays for Sri Lanka Army Sports Club. He was born in Kalutara.

Fernando made his cricketing debut for Kalutara Town Club Under-23s during the 2007 season, before playing for Sri Lanka Army Sports Club's Under-23 team in the following season.

Fernando made his List A debut during the 2009-10 season, against Saracens Sports Club, scoring 34 runs.

Fernando's first-class debut came in the same week, against Chilaw Marians Sports Club, against whom he scored 10 runs in the only innings in which he batted.

References

External links
Suresh Fernando at Cricket Archive

1986 births
Living people
Sri Lankan cricketers
Sri Lanka Army Sports Club cricketers
People from Western Province, Sri Lanka